The 1997–98 FIS Ski Jumping World Cup was the 19th World Cup season in ski jumping and the 8th official World Cup season in ski flying. It began in Lillehammer, Norway on 29 November 1997 and finished in Planica, Slovenia on 22 March 1998. The individual World Cup was won by Primož Peterka and Nations Cup by Japan.

Lower competitive circuits this season included the Grand Prix and Continental Cup.

Map of world cup hosts 
All 20 locations which have been hosting world cup events for men this season. Oberstdorf hosted world cup/ski flying world championships event and four hills tournament.

 Four Hills Tournament
 Nordic Tournament

Calendar

Men

Standings

Overall

Ski Jumping (JP) Cup

Ski Flying

Nations Cup

Four Hills Tournament

Nordic Tournament

References 

World cup
World cup
FIS Ski Jumping World Cup